Eric Pearce may refer to:

 Eric Pearce (broadcaster) (1905–1997), Australian broadcaster
 Eric Pearce (athlete) (1936–1997), British Paralympian
 Eric Pearce (field hockey) (born 1931), Australian field hockey player

See also
Erik Pears (born 1982), American football player